Rufoclanis is a genus of moths in the family Sphingidae erected by Robert Herbert Carcasson in 1968.

Species
Rufoclanis erlangeri (Rothschild & Jordan, 1903)
Rufoclanis fulgurans (Rothschild & Jordan, 1903)
Rufoclanis jansei (Vari, 1964)
Rufoclanis maccleeryi Carcasson, 1968
Rufoclanis numosae (Wallengren, 1860)
Rufoclanis rosea (Druce, 1882)

References

 
Smerinthini
Moth genera
Taxa named by Robert Herbert Carcasson